Association Sportive Bantous is a Congolese football club based in Mbuji-Mayi, Kasai-Oriental province and currently playing in the Linafoot Ligue 2, the second level of the Congolese football.

History
AS Bantous was founded in 1961 and they have won the Linafoot, the most important football league in the Democratic Republic of the Congo in 1995.

He was also a finalist of the Coupe du Congo (DR Congo) in 1994, in which he was defeated by DC Motema Pembe. 
Internationally they have participated in 3 continental tournaments, in which they have never passed the second round.

Honours
Linafoot
 Winners (1): 1995

Coupe du Congo
 Runners-up (1): 1994

Performance in CAF competitions
African Cup of Champions Clubs / CAF Champions League: 1 appearances
1996 – First Round
CAF Cup: 2 appearances
1994 – Second Round
1997 – Second Round

References

External links
Club profile - Soccerway.com
Club logo

Football clubs in the Democratic Republic of the Congo
Mbuji-Mayi